Réquiem para Laura Martin is a 2011 Brazilian drama film directed by Luiz Rangel and Paulo Duarte, starring Anselmo Vasconcelos, Claudia Alencar and Ana Paula Serpa.

The film premiered at the 39th edition of the Gramado Film Festival, winning the awards for best direction and best actress, for Claudia Alencar, at the Festcine Petrópolis. It was nominated for three categories at the Madrid International Film Festival, including the categories of best film, best foreign film and best song, composed by Paulo Duarte, Claudio Girardi and Marconi de Morais.

Plot
A famous conductor divides his obsession for music with the sickly love for his muse Laura Martin. A strange love triangle is formed between the conductor, Laura and Rachel, the wife of the conductor, who ends up accepting the situation to not lose her husband.

Cast
 Anselmo Vasconcellos as The conductor
 Claudia Alencar as Raquel
 Ana Paula Serpa as Laura Martin
 Carlo Mossy as Dr. Guilherme
 José Fernando Muniz as Jonas
 Luciano Szafir as Giulliano

References

External links
 
 

Brazilian drama films
2011 drama films
2011 films
2010s Portuguese-language films